Andrea Electronics Corporation is an American software, technology, and manufacturing corporation headquartered in Bohemia, New York.

History and products
Andrea Electronics was founded as Andrea Radio Corporation in 1934 by Frank A. D. Andrea Sr.

In the 1960s, the company designed the intercom communication system used in the first crewed Mercury space flight capsule as well as military intercoms for helicopters and the F-16 fighter jet.

In 1998, the company pioneered microphone array technology, which has become a standard for hands-free VoIP communication embedding its advanced noise-cancellation technology into millions of computers produced by global manufacturers, including Dell and Hewlett-Packard.

In more recent years, it began manufacturing its own brand of headsets known as SuperBeam headsets.  The company has created boom-free, all-purpose headsets essentially applying its microphone array technology to the headset industry.

After 75 years of predominantly working with NASA and the U.S. Department of Defense as well as doing OEM work for several companies, the company decided to create a line of advanced digital array microphones for use in IoT devices, information kiosks, aerospace, robotics, and  automotive telematics applications that employ technologies such as natural language processing and artificial intelligence.

See also

 List of microphone manufacturers
 List of New York companies

References

External links

1934 establishments in New York (state)
Companies based in Suffolk County, New York
Electronics companies established in 1934
Audio equipment manufacturers of the United States
Headphones manufacturers
Islip (town), New York
Manufacturing companies based in New York (state)
Microphone manufacturers
Companies traded over-the-counter in the United States